Pensacolops is a monotypic genus of Brazilian jumping spiders containing the single species, Pensacolops rubrovittata. It was first described by M. J. Bauab V. in 1983, and is only found in Brazil. The name is a combination of the salticid genus Pensacola and the Ancient Greek "-ops", meaning "to look like". The species name is a combination of the Latin rubrus, meaning "red", and vittatus, which means "striped".

References

Monotypic Salticidae genera
Salticidae
Spiders of Brazil